Kirby David Dar Dar (born March 27, 1972) is a retired American professional football wide receiver. He played college football at Syracuse as a running back. He was signed by the Miami Dolphins of the National Football League (NFL) as an undrafted rookie free agent in 1995. He also played for the New York/New Jersey Hitmen of the XFL in 2001.

Dar Dar currently resides in Syracuse, New York and was the head coach of the short-lived Syracuse Soldiers of the American Indoor Football Association (AIFL) in 2006.

Early years
Kirby David Dar Dar was born on March 27, 1972, the son of Kirby David Dar Dar, Sr.. He attended Thomas Jefferson High School in Tampa, Florida where he played high school football and participated in track. On the football team, he was a three time letterman, as well as a team captain during his senior year. As a senior running back, he was named Hillsborough County Player-of-the-Year after rushing for over 1,700 yards and 17 touchdowns. He was also a two-time All-Sun Coast and three time All-conference selection.

College career
Dar Dar then attended Syracuse University where he majored in political science and was a four-year letterman at running back. He redshirt as a true freshman. As a redshirt freshman, he appeared in every game, he returned a kickoff 95-yards for a touchdown against Florida. As a sophomore, he recorded a 100-yard touchdown on a reverse on a kickoff against Colorado in the Fiesta Bowl. As a senior, he recorded 188 carries for 853 yards and 10 touchdowns. He recorded a career-high 159 yards again Maryland.

For his career, Dar Dar recorded 292 carries for 1,337 yards and 11 touchdowns, as well as 27 receptions for 266 yards and three touchdowns.

Professional career
After going unselected in the 1995 NFL draft, Dar Dar was signed as a rookie free agent by the Miami Dolphins.

As a in 1995, he spent the first 15 weeks of the season on the Dolphins' practice squad, appearing in the season finale, returning one kickoff for 22 yards. He appeared in 11 games in 1996 returning seven kickoffs for 132 yards. In 1997, he suffered a torn anterior cruciate ligament (ACL) in his right knee, during a scrimmage before the season, and spent the entire season on injured reserve. In 1998, he returned and appeared in two games. After struggling during the off season and pre-season at wide receiver, he was waived on October 1, 1998 to make room for Horace Copeland. He was signed by the Kansas City Chiefs in August, 1999. He was released less than a month later. He returned to Kansas City in 2000, spending the pre-season with the Chiefs. In 2001, he was signed as free agent by the New York/New Jersey Hitmen of the XFL. For the season, he recorded 22 receptions for 405 yards and two touchdowns. He also returned 22 kickoffs for 485 yards, as well as 26 punts for 287 yards.

Career statistics

Coaching career
In 2006, Dar Dar served as the head coach of the Syracuse Soldiers of the American Indoor Football Association (AIFL). The team finished with a 1-10 record, and ceased operations after only one season.

References

External links
 Phins report on Kirby Dar Dar

1972 births
Living people
African-American players of American football
Players of American football from Louisiana
People from Morgan City, Louisiana
Thomas Jefferson High School (Tampa, Florida) alumni
Syracuse Orange football players
Miami Dolphins players
Kansas City Chiefs players
New York/New Jersey Hitmen players
21st-century African-American sportspeople
20th-century African-American sportspeople